The Municipality of Rogaška Slatina is a municipality in the traditional region of Styria in northeastern Slovenia. The seat of the municipality is the town of Rogaška Slatina. Rogaška Slatina became a municipality in 1994.

Settlements
In addition to the municipal seat of Rogaška Slatina, the municipality also includes the following settlements:

 Brestovec
 Brezje pri Podplatu
 Čača Vas
 Cerovec pod Bočem
 Ceste
 Drevenik
 Gabrce
 Gabrovec pri Kostrivnici
 Gradiški Dol
 Irje
 Kačji Dol
 Kamence
 Kamna Gorca
 Male Rodne
 Nimno
 Plat
 Podplat
 Podturn
 Pristavica
 Prnek
 Rajnkovec
 Ratanska Vas
 Rjavica
 Spodnja Kostrivnica
 Spodnje Negonje
 Spodnje Sečovo
 Spodnji Gabernik
 Strmec pri Svetem Florijanu
 Sveti Florijan
 Tekačevo
 Topole
 Tržišče
 Tuncovec
 Velike Rodne
 Vinec
 Zagaj pod Bočem
 Zgornja Kostrivnica
 Zgornje Negonje
 Zgornje Sečovo
 Zgornji Gabernik

References

External links

Municipality of Rogaška Slatina on Geopedia
Municipality of Rogaška Slatina website

 
Rogaška Slatina
1994 establishments in Slovenia